was a Japanese bureaucrat and businessman.

Biography 
He was born in Ashiya in Hyogo Prefecture and studied at Clare College, Cambridge.

During the Occupation he was a member of Shigeru Yoshida's government. He is particularly remembered in Japan for an incident in Christmas 1945 where he delivered a present from Hirohito, Emperor of Japan to General Douglas MacArthur. When MacArthur told him to place it on the floor, Shirasu demanded a table to show respect. In 2009 he was the subject of an NHK drama.

His wife Masako Shirasu was a collector and expert of fine Japanese art, on which she published a number of books. Their house Buaisō became a museum.

References

External links
 Old Shirasu Residence "Buaiso"
 白洲次郎・正子が終の棲家に選んだ幕末期の養蚕農家〈The house of ericulture farmer in the end of Edo period that Jiro and Masako Shirasu chose as their final residence〉

1902 births
1985 deaths
20th-century Japanese businesspeople
20th-century Japanese politicians
People from Hyōgo Prefecture
Alumni of Clare College, Cambridge